The Absecon Lighthouse is a coastal lighthouse located in the north end of Atlantic City, New Jersey, overlooking Absecon Inlet.  At  it is the tallest lighthouse in the state of New Jersey and the third-tallest masonry lighthouse in the United States. 

Construction on Absecon Lighthouse began in 1854, with the light first lit on January 15, 1857. The lighthouse was deactivated in 1933 and, although the light still shines every night, it is no longer an active navigational aid. The lighthouse is open to public visitation and, for a small donation, one may climb to the watch room and external gallery.  A re-creation of the keepers' quarters was opened in 2002 and serves as a museum and gift shop. The original oil house now contains a Fresnel lens exhibit. Along with school and group tours, the Absecon Lighthouse offers an overnight program for Scouts, a winter arts program for children, and a wide variety of special events throughout the year.

The Absecon Lighthouse was designed by George Meade and still retains its original first-order fixed Fresnel lens. The lens is made of lead glass and weighs  As the light was fixed (non-flashing), it does not have a landward segment allowing visitors to look up in the lens where the keepers entered it for maintenance.

Jack E. Boucher conceived and oversaw the preservation of the lighthouse in 1964.

The lighthouse is listed on the National Register of Historic Places, the Historic American Buildings Survey, and the New Jersey Register of Historic Places.

Museum
Absecon Lighthouse has a history museum located in the replicated 1925 Keeper's House.  Exhibits include ocean life, shipwrecks, keepers and lighthouse history, local memorabilia, and restoration photos.  The Oil House has a Fresnel Lens exhibit.  Visitors can climb the 228 steps to the top of the lighthouse.  Educational programs are offered for groups and children.

See also

 List of museums in New Jersey
 List of tallest buildings in Atlantic City
 National Register of Historic Places listings in Atlantic County, New Jersey

References

External links

Historic Absecon Lighthouse - official site, visitor information
 Absecon Light at American Byways
 NPS - Absecon Light at Historic light stations
 HABS/HAER record of the Absecon lighthouse
 Absecon Lighthouse - from Lighthousefriends.com
 New Jersey State Historic Sites NJ Division of Parks and Forestry

Lighthouses completed in 1856
Buildings and structures in Atlantic City, New Jersey
Lighthouses on the National Register of Historic Places in New Jersey
Lighthouse museums in New Jersey
Museums in Atlantic County, New Jersey
New Jersey Register of Historic Places
Transportation buildings and structures in Atlantic County, New Jersey